Servus, and various local variants thereof, is a salutation used in many parts of Central and Eastern Europe. It is a word of greeting or parting like the Italian  (which also comes from the slave meaning through Venetian ).   It was once common in some regions of the Austro-Hungarian Empire but it has fallen in disuse in part of its former range. 

The salutation is spelled  in German, Bavarian,  Slovak, Romanian, and Czech. In Rusyn and Ukrainian it is spelled , in the Cyrillic alphabet.

In the last two it is also spelled .

Etymology

( is also the origin of the word "serf".) The phrase is an ellipsis of a Latin expression , meaning "[your] most humble servant, [my] noble lord". Nevertheless, no trace of subservience is implied in its modern use, which has only the cliché force of "at your service".

Usage
Use of this expression is roughly coincident with the boundaries of the former Austro-Hungarian Empire. It is especially popular in Austria, Hungary, Slovakia, Romania (mostly in Transylvania), as well as in southern parts of Germany (Bavaria, Baden-Württemberg, Palatinate, middle and southern Hesse), northern Croatia, eastern Slovenia (mostly in Slovenian Styria), and western Ukraine. It may be rarely used in Czech Republic and Poland (where it is considered an archaism, not used in common speech). The word may be used as a greeting, a parting salutation, or as both, depending on the region and context.

Despite its formal origins,  is now used as an informal greeting in Bavaria, Baden-Württemberg, Austria, Südtirol, Slovenia, Hungary, and Romania.

See also 
 , an Italian greeting of similar origin
 , a Swedish greeting of similar origin, literally meaning "servant"

References

Greeting words and phrases
Parting phrases